A city is a classification of municipalities used in the Canadian province of British Columbia.  British Columbia's Lieutenant Governor in Council may incorporate a community as a city by letters patent, under the recommendation of the Minister of Communities, Sport and Cultural Development, if its population is greater than 5,000 and the outcome of a vote involving affected residents was that greater than 50% voted in favour of the proposed incorporation.

British Columbia has 52 cities that had a cumulative population of 3,327,824 and an average population of 63,997 in the 2016 census. British Columbia's largest and smallest cities are Vancouver and Greenwood with populations of 631,486 and 665 respectively.

The first community to incorporate as a city was New Westminster on July 16, 1860, while the province's newest city is Mission, which was redesignated from a district municipality to a city on March 29, 2021.



List 

Notes:

Former cities 
Sandon held city status between 1898 and 1920. Phoenix held city status between 1900 and 1919.

City status eligibility 
As of the 2021 census, nine towns – Comox, Creston, Ladysmith, Oliver, Osoyoos, Qualicum Beach, Sidney, Smithers and View Royal – meet the requirement of having populations greater than 5,000 to incorporate as a city. Also, 21 district municipalities meet the minimum population requirements to incorporate as a city.

Gallery

See also 
List of communities in British Columbia
List of municipalities in British Columbia
List of district municipalities in British Columbia
List of towns in British Columbia
List of villages in British Columbia

References 

British Columbia
populated places B